Farah Emad Ahmad Al-Azab is a Jordanian footballer who plays as a midfielder. She has been a member of the Jordan women's national team.

International goals

References

Living people
Jordanian women's footballers
Women's association football midfielders
Jordan women's international footballers
Footballers at the 2010 Asian Games
Asian Games competitors for Jordan
1989 births